William John "Nipper" Truscott Jr. (9 October 1886 in Lithgow, New South Wales – 20 June 1966 in East Fremantle, Western Australia) was an Australian sportsman. He was inducted into the Sport Australia Hall of Fame in 1985 and the Australian Football Hall of Fame in 1996.

Early life
Born to Susannah (née Strickland) and William John Truscott in Lithgow, Truscott grew up in Sydney where he played rugby football. He moved with his family to Kalgoorlie on the Western Australian Goldfields at the age of 14, and began playing for the Trafalgar Football Club's junior side.

Football career
Truscott was a durable rover (175 cm, 66 kg), who played to age 41. Lithgow born Truscott was a doyen of West Australian football, and an all round sportsman, once representing Western Australia in a first-class cricket match as a wicket-keeper and also playing bowls.  Partnered by Harry Snook, he won an Australian pairs bowls title in 1955.

Nicknamed 'Nipper' as a boy for his quickness in Rugby Union, he grew up in Sydney, only taking up Australian rules football when his family moved to the goldfields in Kalgoorlie, Western Australia in 1899.  He was an exceptional player for Mines Rovers club at a time when the Goldfields League was considered to be almost the equal of any other league in the country.  Truscott was chosen to represent Western Australia in the 1908 national carnival side – the first of his record five carnival appearances over 18 years.

Having married in 1912 he then moved to Perth where he became a postmaster. He commenced in the 1913 season with the East Fremantle Football Club, and quickly established himself as the WAFL's leading centreman.  His ability to pass the ball (always with a drop kick) accurately to teammates was a feature of his play.  He played in three premiership teams and in seven that were runners-up.  He later acted as coach, club and State selector, club secretary and delegate.

Truscott died at the age of 79, on 20 June 1966 in Western Australia. He was an inaugural member of the Western Australian Institute's Hall of Fame in August 1985, and in the same year he was listed in the Sport Australia Hall of Fame.

Truscott was made a member of the Fremantle Football Club created Fremantle Football Hall of Legends in 1996. In 2004 he was awarded Legend Status in the West Australian Football Hall of Fame.  The Nipper Truscott Pavilion at East Fremantle Oval – site of the first AFL game for the Fremantle club – is named in his honour.
 
In 1996 Truscott was inducted into the Australian Football Hall of Fame.

See also
 1908 Melbourne Carnival
 List of Western Australia first-class cricketers

Footnotes

References

 
 Australian Dictionary of Biography
 AFL: Hall of Fame
 Cricinfo profile

1886 births
1966 deaths
Australian male bowls players
Australian cricketers
Australian Football Hall of Fame inductees
Australian rules footballers from Western Australia
East Fremantle Football Club coaches
East Fremantle Football Club players
Mines Rovers Football Club players
People from Kalgoorlie
People from the Central Tablelands
Perth Football Club coaches
Sport Australia Hall of Fame inductees
West Australian Football Hall of Fame inductees
Western Australia cricketers
Wicket-keepers
Australian rules footballers from Sydney